Notosara is a moth genus of the family Depressariidae.

Species
 Notosara acosmeta (Common, 1964)
 Notosara nephelotis Meyrick, 1890

References

Depressariinae
Moth genera
Taxa named by Edward Meyrick